The flag and coat of arms of Jurbarkas represents Jurbarkas, Lithuania with three silver-white fleurs-de-lis – two over one – centred on a red background. The flag is a red banner using the fleur-de-lis as its charge, repeated three times. An example of heraldic flag design, the flag employs the city's coat of arms, making it a banner of arms. The design of the arms of Jurbarkas is believed to originate from the arms of the Sapieha house, a noble family from the Grand Duchy of Lithuania which was responsible for Jurbarkas receiving city rights and the coat of arms for in 1611.

The three fleurs-de-lis design was abolished during the final years of the Polish–Lithuanian Commonwealth, but officially restored in 1993 after the independence of present-day Lithuania. Before restoration, several variant designs, such as using one over two fleurs-de-lis, had been restored and abolished. The original two over one version was briefly readopted in 1970 during the Soviet period, but abolished that same year.

Gallery

References 

Municipal coats of arms in Lithuania
Coats of arms with fleurs de lis
1993 establishments in Lithuania